In music, the acoustic scale, overtone scale, Lydian dominant scale, Lydian 7 scale, or the Pontikonisian Scale is a seven-note synthetic scale.

This differs from the major scale in having an augmented fourth and a minor seventh scale degree. It is the fourth mode of the melodic minor ascending scale. The term "acoustic scale" is sometimes used to describe a particular mode of this seven-note collection (e.g. the specific ordering C–D–E–F–G–A–B) and is sometimes used to describe the collection as a whole (e.g. including orderings such as E–F–G–A–B–C–D).

History 
In traditional music, the overtone scale persists in the music of peoples of South Siberia, especially in Tuvan music. Overtone singing and the sound of the Jew's harp are naturally rich in overtones, but melodies performed on the igil (bowed instrument distantly related to the violin) and plucked string instruments such as the doshpuluur or the chanzy also often follow the overtone scale, sometimes with pentatonic slices.

The acoustic scale appears sporadically in nineteenth-century music, notably in the works of Franz Liszt and Claude Debussy. It also plays a role in the music of twentieth-century composers, including Igor Stravinsky, Béla Bartók, and Karol Szymanowski, who was influenced by folk music from the Polish Highlands. The acoustic scale is also remarkably common in the music of Nordeste, the northeastern region of Brazil (see Escala nordestina). It plays a major role in jazz harmony, where it is used to accompany dominant seventh chords starting on the first scale degree. The term "acoustic scale" was coined by Ernő Lendvai in his analysis of the music of Béla Bartók.

Construction 

The name "acoustic scale" refers to the resemblance to the eighth through 14th partials in the harmonic series.

The acoustic scale may be formed from a major triad (C E G) with an added minor seventh and raised fourth (B and F, drawn from the overtone series) and major second and major sixth (D and A). Lendvai described the use of the "acoustic system" accompanying the acoustic scale in Bartók's music, since it entails structural characteristics such as symmetrically balanced sections, especially periods, in contrast with his use of the golden ratio. In Bartók's music, the acoustic scale is characterized in various ways including diatonic, dynamic, tense, and triple- or other odd-metered, as opposed to the music structured by the Fibonacci sequence which is chromatic, static, relaxed, and duple-metered.

Another way to regard the acoustic scale is that it occurs as a mode of the melodic minor scale starting on the fourth degree. Hence, the acoustic scale starting on D is D, E, F, G, A, B, C, D, containing the familiar sharpened F and G of A melodic minor. The F turns the D minor tetrachord into a major tetrachord, and the G turns it Lydian. Therefore, many occurrences of this scale in jazz may be regarded as unsurprising; it shows up in modal improvisation and composition over harmonic progressions which invite use of the melodic minor.

See also
Chord-scale system
Jazz scale
Mystic chord
Scale of harmonics
Vachaspati (raga)

Notes

References

External links
The Acoustic scale (Lydian dominant), all keys, for ocarina

Heptatonic scales
Hemitonic scales
Tritonic scales